Eisert (North German: from a shortening of the ancient Germanic personal name Isenhart composed of the elements īsan "iron" + hard "hardy, brave, strong".) is a German surname. Notable people with the surname include:
 Jens Eisert (born 1970), German physicist
 Sandra Eisert (born 1952),  American photojournalist, now an art director and picture editor

See also

German-language surnames
Surnames from given names
Low German surnames